The phrase "ash heap of history", literarily speaking, refers to ghost towns or artifacts that have lost their relevance. 

Visiting Rome in the 14th century, Italian writer Petrarch called the city "a rubbish heap of history". In 1887 the English essayist Augustine Birrell (1850–1933) coined the term in his series of essays, "Obiter Dicta": that great dust heap called 'history.' 

A notable usage was that of the Russian Bolshevik Leon Trotsky referring to the Mensheviks: "Go where you belong from now on – into the dustbin of history!" as the Menshevik faction walked out of the All-Russian Congress of Soviets on 25 October 1917 in Petrograd.

In a speech to the British House of Commons, on 8 June 1982, U.S. President Ronald Reagan later responded that "freedom and democracy will leave Marxism and Leninism on the ash heap of history".

Notes

References

Political catchphrases
English phrases
Historical negationism
14th-century neologisms
Metaphors referring to objects